Gabarus is a community in the Canadian province of Nova Scotia, located in the Cape Breton Regional Municipality.  It was an important fisheries centre with a cannery until the mid-20th century.  Today, it is sustained by tourism and small-scale commercial fishing, including lobster.

There is a sign: Established 1716 at the edge of the village.

References
  Gabarus on Destination Nova Scotia

Communities in the Cape Breton Regional Municipality
General Service Areas in Nova Scotia